Anete Paulus (born 27 September 1991) is an Estonian football player who plays as a defender for Naiste Meistriliiga club Pärnu. She represented the Estonia national team from 2008 to 2017.

References

External links

1991 births
Living people
Footballers from Tallinn
Women's association football defenders
Estonian women's footballers
Estonia women's international footballers
Pärnu JK players